The Djiwarli, also written Jiwarli, are an Aboriginal Australian people of the Pilbara region of Western Australia.

Language
The Jiwarli speak one of four dialects of Mantharta, the other members of the dialect continuum being the Thiin, Warriyangka and Tharrkari.

Country
Their northeastern reaches touched only as far as the Ashburton River divide.

Alternative names
 Jivali
 Jiwali
 Tivali
 Tjiwali.

Source:

Notes

Citations

Sources

Aboriginal peoples of Western Australia